Lifetime Supply of Guilt is the third album by melodic death metal band The Duskfall. The album was the band's first release through Nuclear Blast.

Track listing
 "Trust Is Overrated" − 2:12
 "The Shallow End" − 3:16
 "Break the Pact" − 4:53
 "A Stubborn Soul" − 4:12
 "Shoot It In" − 3:21
 "Going Down Screaming" − 4:49
 "Hours are Wasted" − 4:23
 "Sympathy Has Decreased" − 4:57
 "Downright Dreadful" − 3:35
 "Relive Your Fall" − 2:31

In media
 The music video for the song "Shoot It In" is featured in the video game The Darkness.

References

The Duskfall albums
2005 albums
Nuclear Blast albums